Mario Zapata Vinces (29 April 1920 – unknown) was a Peruvian chess player.

Biography
To the 1950s Mario Zapata Vinces was one of the leading Peruvian chess players. He was participant and medalist the Peruvian Chess Championships. In 1959, he shared 12th - 14th place in International Chess Tournament in Lima (tournament won Borislav Ivkov and Luděk Pachman).

Mario Zapata Vinces played for Peru in the Chess Olympiad:
 In 1950, at third board in the 9th Chess Olympiad in Dubrovnik (+4, =7, -4).

References

External links

Mario Zapata Vinces chess games at 365chess.com

1920 births
Year of death missing
Peruvian chess players
Chess Olympiad competitors
20th-century Peruvian people